Oskari Setänen (born April 28, 1994) is a Finnish professional ice hockey goaltender. He is currently playing for KooKoo of the Finnish Liiga.

Setänen made his Liiga debut playing with Lukko during the 2013–14 Liiga season.

References

External links

1994 births
Living people
Ässät players
Finnish ice hockey goaltenders
KooKoo players
People from Lieto
Lukko players
Mikkelin Jukurit players
Sportspeople from Southwest Finland
HC TPS players
TuTo players